Elizabeth Dunne (born 12 January 1956) is an Irish judge who has served as a Judge of the Supreme Court of Ireland since July 2013. She previously served as a Judge of the High Court from 2004 to 2013 and a Judge of the Circuit Court from 1996 to 2004.

Early career
Dunne was educated at University College Dublin and received a Bachelor of Civil Law degree and then subsequently studied at the King's Inns. She was called to the Bar in 1977. She had a broad practice, encompassing family, commercial, chancery and banking law and defamation law proceedings.

In 1986, she appeared on The Late Late Show with Harry Whelehan in a simulated court argument to advocate a vote in favour of the Fifteenth Amendment of the Constitution of Ireland. She co-signed a letter in 1983 opposing the Eighth Amendment.

She became a Bencher of the King's Inns in 2004.

Judicial career

Circuit Court
Dunne was appointed a Judge of the Circuit Court in 1996. She was primarily a judge on the Dublin Circuit Criminal Court. She also heard cases involving personal injuries and employment law.

High Court
She became a Judge of the High Court in 2004.

Dunne was the chairperson of the Referendum Commission established for the 32nd Amendment Bill 2013 and 33rd Amendment of the Constitution.

Supreme Court
She was appointed to the Supreme Court by President Michael D. Higgins, on the nomination of the Government of Ireland in July 2013.

Personal life
She is married to James Dwyer, a barrister. Their two children Daniel and Lucy are both barristers.

References

1956 births
Living people
Irish barristers
Judges of the Supreme Court of Ireland
Alumni of University College Dublin
Irish women judges
Circuit Court (Ireland) judges
People from County Roscommon
High Court judges (Ireland)
Chairpersons of the Referendum Commission
Alumni of King's Inns